Baldeo Das Birla was an Indian entrepreneur. He contributed to the establishment of the Medical College Calcutta, and also built the Laxminarayan Temple, Delhi, also known as Birla Mandir, which was inaugurated by Mahatma Gandhi in 1939.

Business 
When Britain was trading opium with China, Baldeo Das Birla, who was an adopted son of Shiv Narayan Birla used this opportunity to engage cargo ships in partnership with other tradesmen to trade opium with China. In 1887, Baldeo Das moved to Calcutta to set up business.

Personal life 
In the book by his great-grandson, Yash Birla mentioned that Baldeo Das Birla was named Raja by the British. The book further states that both Baldeo and his wife were both simple people who were deeply religious and superstitious.

Baladeo Birla and his wife had four sons: Jugal Kishore, Rameshwar Das, Ghanshyam Das Birla, and Braj Mohan Birla.

Baldeo Das was awarded the Raibahadur title in 1917. In 1920, he retired from business and started living in Banares pursuing religious studies. In 1925, he was awarded the title of "Raja" by the Maharaja of Dumraon. He was awarded D. Litt. by Banaras Hindu University.

Writings by Baldeo Das Birla
 Chhandogyopnishada Rahasya, 1926
 Vedanta va Atmavichara, 1935
 Darshanik Vichara, 1950

See also
Birla family
Birla Foundation
Medical College and Hospital Building, Calcutta

References 

 URL accessed on 1 April 2006

Indian philanthropists
Rajasthani people
Baldeo Das
1863 births
1956 deaths
Founders of Indian schools and colleges